Pusiola minutissima is a moth of the family Erebidae. It was described by Sergius G. Kiriakoff in 1958. It is found in Ghana, Kenya, Nigeria and Uganda.

References

Lithosiini
Moths described in 1958
Moths of Africa